Sons of Cuba is a 2009 documentary film set in the Havana Boxing Academy, a school at the heart of Cuba's Olympic success in the ring.  It follows the stories of three young hopefuls through eight months of training and schooling as they prepare for Cuba's National Boxing Championship for Under-12's. Sons of Cuba was directed by Andrew Lang and is distributed by Cinetic Rights Management for the US and Canada and Ro*co Films for the rest of the world.

Awards and nominations
 Winner, Best Documentary at the 2009 Los Angeles Latino International Film Festival 
 Winner, Best Documentary at the 2009 International Rome Film Festival
 Winner, Youth Jury Award at the 2009 Sheffield Doc/Fest
 Winner, Best Film on Latin America by a non-Latin American at the 2009 Havana Film Festival
 Winner, Best Documentary by the 2009 Foundation of New Latin American Cinema
 Nominated, Best Documentary at the 2009 British Independent Film Awards
 Opening Night Film at the 2009 Full Frame Documentary Film Festival

References

External links
 
 
 Full Frame Documentary Film Festival
 International Rome Film Festival
 Sheffield Doc/Fest
 British Independent Film Awards
 Palm Springs International Film Festival 
 Sons of Cuba review in Variety
 Sons of Cuba review in The Hollywood Reporter
 Fandango, Italian distributor
 Andrew Lang interview with The Huffington Post

Cuban documentary films
2009 documentary films
Documentary films about boxing
2009 films
2000s Spanish-language films